Joshua Holtby (born 20 January 1996) is a German professional footballer who plays as a midfielder for Borussia Mönchengladbach II in the Regionalliga West.

Career
On 10 January 2019, Holtby signed a six-month contract with the Dutch club MVV Maastricht with an option to extend the contract by another year.

He made his Eerste Divisie debut for MVV on 13 January 2019 in a game against Twente, as a starter.

Personal life
His older brother Lewis Holtby is also a footballer and represented Germany internationally.

References

External links
 

1996 births
People from Erkelenz
Sportspeople from Cologne (region)
German people of English descent
Living people
German footballers
Association football midfielders
Borussia Mönchengladbach II players
SV Rödinghausen players
FC Wegberg-Beeck players
Alemannia Aachen players
MVV Maastricht players
SC Preußen Münster players
Regionalliga players
Eerste Divisie players
German expatriate footballers
German expatriate sportspeople in the Netherlands
Expatriate footballers in the Netherlands
Footballers from North Rhine-Westphalia